Bagher Moazen (born 2 September 1948) is a well known Iranian-Canadian classical guitarist and composer. He is also a Tango dancer and instructor.

Biography
Thanks to a booming Iranian oil industry, Bagher began a musical journey from which there was no return. Born in the south of Iran he grew up at a time when the oil industry brought Western music and film to this area. Looking to widen his horizons from his roots in traditional Persian music, Bagher fell in love with these new influences. He was captured by the beauty of Western melodies and classical music he heard on film and on radio. His imagination stirred, Bagher began to sing the music he heard.

Bagher first started guitar under Abdullah Mafakher who introduced him to the delights of Spanish music. His next inspiration and teacher was the well-known French musician, Dr. Jean During, who had come to Iran to study Persian music. Later, in 1973, Bagher continued his studies in London. He met Joseph Urshalmi, and studied with him to improve his right-hand technique. Upon the recommendation of Julian Bream, this was followed by three years of intensive study with Timothy Walker. Walker opened Bagher's mind to revolutionary methods of fingering, articulation and interpretation.

Building on this, Bagher continued to refine his knowledge with John W. Duarte.

In 1979, Bagher returned to Iran to become the first teacher of the classical guitar for full-time students at the Royal Conservatory of Music.
Later he opened his own school of music. However, by 1985, the political situation became impossible, as music was banned. He left once more to go to Germany and subsequently to Canada. In 1987, Bagher arrived to Canada. After residing in Montreal for 8 months, he moved to and continues to live in Toronto.

Major concerts and events
Bagher has been teaching music and giving concerts regularly since his arrival in Canada in 1987.

CD release
In 2003, Bagher released his CD, Nomad, featuring an international repertoire of music rich in melody and rhythm from composers such as Carlo Domeniconi, Lorca, Paco De Lucia, Roland Dyens, Rak plus his own compositions. This CD was highlighted on CBC's Music and Company, March 19, 2004. Tracks were also broadcast out of London, England at the beginning of June 2005 on the BBC. The CD has become quite popular among classical guitar fans.

Awards and recognitions
 The first Iranian guitarist to play at the prestigious Wigmore Hall, London
 The first Iranian guitarist to play for the Guitar Society of Toronto
 The first Iranian guitarist to be interviewed by British Broadcasting Corporation (BBC)
 John W. Duarte, in his letter to Bagher, wrote that [Bagher's] music "is a unique amalgam of Eastern and Western music."
 In 1970 Bagher received a gold medal for his outstanding artistic achievement throughout Iran.
 The first guitar instructor of the International Academy of Music in Iran.

Guitar and Tango instructor
As well as performing, Bagher continues to nurture a new generation of classical musicians. He has been teaching for over 35 years, using special methods that accelerate learning and provide maximum enjoyment of the learning process. He also specializes in the Shinichi Suzuki (violinist) method of teaching. Also Bagher was the first instructor to teach guitar in the International Academy of Music in Iran.
Moreover, Bagher teaches Tango dance by applying unique teaching methods since 2005.

Many of Bagher's guitar students have become professional prestigious guitarists who are active in performing well-known complicated pieces at prominent concerts and other events.

Among the long list of his students are: (sorted alphabetically)

 Ali Naraghi
 Alireza Tafaghodi
 Amir Abbas Aliabadi
 Babak Falsafi
 Bijan Zelli (www.bijanzelli.com)
 Araz  Boghossian
 Bahram Mazloumian
 Dariush Afrasiabi
 Kazem Moazen, Canada
 Kiarash Mohajer
 Maneli Jamal
 Mina Shekarbani
 Mohammad Reza Chitsaz, Germany
 Payam Ashtiani
 Sadegh Moazzen, Germany
 Babak Mirab
 Shahin Alavi
 Siamak Valaei
and many more prominent guitarists around the world.

Dedications
There are many composers who have dedicated their songs to Bagher such as, Alan Torok's Sonata No. 5, Shahin Farhat and Mehran Ruhani.

Bagher dedicated one of his compositions, Struggle, to Simin Behbahani, the great Iranian poet.

References

Canadian classical guitarists
Canadian male guitarists
Living people
1948 births